Bellair is an unincorporated community in Clay County, Florida, United States.

Notes

Unincorporated communities in Clay County, Florida
Unincorporated communities in Florida